Antonín Barák (born 3 December 1994) is a Czech professional footballer who plays as a midfielder for  club Fiorentina and the Czech Republic national team. After starting his professional career at Příbram in the Czech First League, he moved on to play for Slavia Prague, before moving to Italy to play in Serie A for Udinese, as well as on loan at other clubs in the same league.

Club career
Barák made his career league debut for 1. FK Příbram on 1 June 2013 in a Czech First League 1–1 away draw at Slovan Liberec. He signed for Czech First League club SK Slavia Prague on 30 December 2015 on a contract until June 2019.

On 31 January 2017, Slavia announced that he had signed with Udinese Calcio for a fee of €3 million, but that the transfer would go through after the end of the season.

On 29 January 2020, he joined Serie A club Lecce on loan. On 2 February he scored a goal in a 4–0 home win against Torino, his first match with the salentini side.

On 17 September 2020, he was loaned to Hellas Verona. Verona held an obligation to purchase his rights if certain performance conditions were met.

On 26 August 2022, Barák joined Fiorentina on loan with an option to buy. On 31 January 2023, Fiorentina exercised their option to make the transfer permanent.

International career
Barák was called up to the Czech national team for the first time in November 2016 to face Norway and Denmark. He made his debut against Denmark on 15 November, scoring a goal. He scored two goals in his competitive debut, a 6–0 victory over San Marino in the 2018 FIFA World Cup qualifying stage on 26 March 2017. He also played in delayed Euro 2020 tournament.

Personal life
On 10 October 2020, Barák tested positive for COVID-19.

Career statistics

Club

International

Scores and results list Czech Republic's goal tally first, score column indicates score after each Barák goal.

Honours
Slavia Prague
 Czech First League: 2016–17

Czech Republic
 China Cup bronze: 2018

References

External links

 Profile at the ACF Fiorentina website 
 
 Antonín Barák official international statistics
 

1994 births
Living people
Sportspeople from Příbram
Czech footballers
Association football midfielders
Czech Republic international footballers
Czech Republic youth international footballers
Czech Republic under-21 international footballers
UEFA Euro 2020 players
Czech First League players
Czech National Football League players
Serie A players
1. FK Příbram players
FC Sellier & Bellot Vlašim players
SK Slavia Prague players
Udinese Calcio players
U.S. Lecce players
Hellas Verona F.C. players
ACF Fiorentina players
Czech expatriate footballers
Czech expatriate sportspeople in Italy
Expatriate footballers in Italy